Talvik or Talvig is a former municipality in Finnmark county, Norway.  The  municipality existed for 101 years, from 1863 until its dissolution in 1964.  The municipality included all the coastal areas in the outer Altafjorden in the northern part of what is now Alta Municipality.  The administrative centre was the village of Talvik where the Talvik Church is located.

History
The municipality was established in 1863, when the large municipality of Alten-Talvig was dissolved and it was divided into two separate municipalities: Talvik (population: 1,938) in the north and Alta (population: 2,442) in the south.  During the 1960s, there were many municipal mergers across Norway due to the work of the Schei Committee. On 1 January 1964, the neighboring municipalities of Talvik (population: 3,266) and Alta (population: 6,629) were merged to form a new, larger Alta Municipality.

Name
The municipality is named after the old Talvik farm since the first Talvik Church was built there. The first element of the name is rather uncertain. If the first element was of Old Norse origin then it is derived from the word  which means "pine" (due to the large number of pine trees in the area. The other explanation is that it is a corruption of the Northern Sami word  or the longer name  which translates as "fog" or "fog bay".

Government
While it existed, this municipality was responsible for primary education (through 10th grade), outpatient health services, senior citizen services, unemployment and other social services, zoning, economic development, and municipal roads. During its existence, this municipality was governed by a municipal council of elected representatives, which in turn elected a mayor.

Municipal council
The municipal council  of Talvik was made up of 21 representatives that were elected to four year terms.  The party breakdown of the final municipal council was as follows:

Mayors
The mayors of Talvik (incomplete list):

1864-1865: Gerhard William Stuhr 
1865-1867: Peder Andreas Olsen 
1867-1871: Knud Toenberg 
1871-1875: Ludvig Kristoffer Olavius Strømme 
1875-1891: Peder Eilertson 
1891-1893: Alexander Kristian William Hald 
1893-1897: Anders Halvorsen 
1897-1900: Andreas Nikolai Hammerø 
1901-1905: Ove Edvard Olsen 
1905-1907: Johan Petter Bjørgan 
1908-1916: Jens Sevald Jensen 
1917-1920: Ludvig Thomassen 
1920-1923: Jens Sevald Jensen 
1924-1926: Ludvig Thomassen 
1926-c.1940: Kristoffer Kristoffersen

See also
List of former municipalities of Norway

References

Alta, Norway
Former municipalities of Norway
1863 establishments in Norway
1964 disestablishments in Norway